"Celestial" (English: "Heavenly") is a Latin pop song written by Carlos Lara and Pedro Damián and recorded by the Mexican pop group RBD for their third Spanish studio album of the same name (2006).

Release
It was confirmed the single to be the second single from the album in January 2007 in Mexico. Originally, in 2006, "Bésame Sin Miedo" was to be released as the second single. Instead, plans were made to release "Bésame Sin miedo" in the rest of Latin America and release "Celestial" only in Mexico. Due to the band being too busy recording RBD: La Familia, promoting both albums (Celestial and Rebels) and touring around the world, plans to release "Bésame sin miedo" were postponed. Therefore, "Celestial" was released in Mexico in March 2007 and in the rest of Latin America the song was sent to radio at the end of April.

Music video
On February 11, 2007, RBD recorded the music video for "Celestial" nearby the Popocatépetl and Iztaccíhuatl volcanos in Mexico City. The video was directed by Esteban Madrazo, who also directed former Spanish single "Ser o Parecer". The group members wear hippie outfits in the video. On February 27, the music video premiered on 'Ritmoson Latino', a Televisa music channel in Mexico.

Chart performance

Awards

Charts

References

2007 singles
RBD songs
Spanish-language songs
2006 songs
EMI Records singles
Songs written by Pedro Damián
Songs written by Carlos Lara (songwriter)